A33, A 33 or A-33 may refer to :
 Douglas A-33, a 1941 American ground-attack fighter aircraft
 A33 Excelsior British heavy tank prototype
 HLA-A33, a human serotype
 Samsung Galaxy A33 5G, an Android smartphone 

and also :
 One of the Encyclopaedia of Chess Openings codes for the English Opening in chess

Roads
 A33 road (England), a road connecting Reading and Southampton
 A33 motorway (France), a road connecting Nancy and Dombasle-sur-Meurthe
 A 33 motorway (Germany), a road connecting the A 30 in the north and the A 44 in the south
 A33 motorway (Italy), a road under construction connecting Asti and Cuneo
 A33 motorway (Spain), a proposed road in Murcia connecting Cieza and Font de la Figuera
 A33 road (Sri Lanka), a road connecting Ja Ela-Ekala-Gampaha-Yakkala
 A33 road (Botswana), a road in Botswana.